Ace Combat: Joint Assault is a 2010 combat flight simulation video game developed by Access Games and published by Namco Bandai Games for the PlayStation Portable. It is the second in the Ace Combat franchise to be released for the PlayStation Portable and the fourth for a portable platform. It is also the first game in the franchise to be set in the real world. The game was released in 2010 in Japan on 26 August, in North America on 31 August, and in Europe on 24 September.

Gameplay
Ace Combat: Joint Assault is a combat flight simulation game but it is presented in a more arcade-like format in contrast to other flight-sim games. The game features both a single-player mode as well as a multiplayer mode supporting ad hoc and infrastructure mode. The game features a co-operative campaign which can be played with up to four players as well as a competitive multiplayer mode supporting up to eight players. Some missions in the campaign will make use of the Joint Assault Mission System, which breaks the players into teams and has them coordinate attacks where each effort can affect the other team's situation. A new feature of the game is the Enhanced Combat View mechanic, which removes the distanced fighting seen in almost every flight simulation game.

Aircraft
Joint Assault features more than 40 licensed aircraft types, plus fictional aircraft from previous installments in the series, particularly Ace Combat X: Skies of Deception. Propeller planes are also available for the first time in the series, with players being able to unlock the F6F-5 Hellcat and the A6M Zero. Frequent use of each aircraft allows the player to unlock more weapons, tune-up parts, paint schemes, and new emblems. The game's official superfighter is the GAF-1 Varcolac.

Plot

Characters
Players assume the role of a pilot freshly hired by a private military company called Martinez Security. The unnamed pilot is assigned to Antares Squadron under the command of Major Frederick Burford. Another squadron within the company, Rigel, has Milosz Sulejmani, Daniel Oruma, Faryd Gaviria, and Kiriakov. The game's antagonists are Romanian Colonel Nicolae Dumitrescu and international insurance businessman Andre Olivieri.

Story
The game is set sometime after the global financial crisis. Off Midway Island, the player begins his first day on the job flying with Martinez Security in an exercise involving the US 7th Fleet and the Japan Maritime Self-Defense Force. After a successful practice run, several unidentified bandits suddenly appear from the east and head due west. Burford breaks the news that the bandits, identified as the terrorist group "Valahia", are attacking Tokyo and the 7th Fleet is seeking Martinez Security's help. The defense of Tokyo is a success, with the destruction of the Valahia's Orgoi flying fortress and heavy damage being dealt to a larger airborne fortress called the Spiridus. Antares Squadron also helps the SDF fend off Valahia attacks at the Boso Peninsula and over the Izu Islands. In the midst of the action, the Rigel Squadron defects to the Valahia and leave Tokyo upon considering a lucrative offer by Valahia leader Colonel Nicolae Dumitrescu.

Embarrassed by the defection, Martinez Security joins the International Union Peacekeeping Force (IUPF) in stopping all Valahia activity around the world, starting with operations in the Middle East and the Balkans. During missions over Croatia and Serbia, the player fends off an attack from Rigel Squadron, now calling themselves the Varcolac Squadron. The crackdown is given an added boost when the IUPF destroys the Spiridus over London. Dimitrescu later announces that the Valahia have captured several former Soviet ballistic missile silos in Central Asia. As the IUPF prepares to attack the silos, the player is ordered to pilot Andre Olivieri's personal Boeing 747-200B over Valahia-controlled territory.

As Antares Squadron destroys the silos and eliminates the Valahia threat, the player discovers that Olivieri used his insurance earnings to finance the Valahia and the IUPF's operations, preparing for an operation named Golden Axe, scheduled to take place over San Francisco. It is revealed that the attacks themselves are part of a plan for Olivieri to establish a monopoly over the global insurance market. He also orders the Valahia eliminated because they went rogue on him with plans to establish a new nation. Antares Squadron, which reorganizes at Midway after the silo attack, is also attacked by the Golden Axe forces in an attempt to prevent them from stopping the operation.

In a final series of missions over Nevada and the Bay Area, Antares engages the rest of the Golden Axe forces and the Varcolac Squadron. After eliminating the Varcolac team, the player is sent to destroy Olivieri's underground data center at his company's headquarters in downtown San Francisco. The data center is destroyed, and Olivieri is killed in the blast, ending any further schemes of the Golden Axe Plan to foment more conflict.

In the aftermath of the Battle of San Francisco, Olivieri's plans are exposed to the public, and the Antares Squadron continues to defend the skies.

Development
The game was officially announced by Namco Bandai on 12 January 2010, although screenshots had been leaked a day before on IGN. The game officially went gold on 13 August.

Reception

Ace Combat: Joint Assault received "mixed or average" reviews, according to review aggregator Metacritic. GameSpot and IGN  stated that the game's story was not as dramatic as those from previous titles, and its saving grace is the co-operative play options and the easy access to new rewards. Gamesradar cited the PSP's control options as a letdown compared to console versions, but lauded the Joint Assault system as an idea worth seeing in future games, especially with Assault Horizon. G4tv.com gave the game a 4/5 score.

Notes

References

External links
Official Japanese Website 
Official European Website

2010 video games
PlayStation Portable games
PlayStation Portable-only games
Combat flight simulators
Video game sequels
Video games developed in Japan
Video games scored by Go Shiina
Video games scored by Inon Zur
Video games set in Egypt
Video games set in Japan
Video games set in London
Video games set in Romania
Video games set in San Francisco
Video games set in Tokyo
Video games set in Turkey
Video games set in Turkmenistan
Video games set in the United Arab Emirates
War video games set in the United States
Multiplayer and single-player video games
Fiction about corporate warfare
Ace Combat spin-off games